Toc or TOC may refer to:

Documents

 Table of contents found at the beginning of a book or document

Organizations
 Transnational organized crime
 Thomson Corporation, by ticker symbol on the New York and Toronto Stock Exchanges
 The Objectivist Center, part of The Atlas Society
 Tactical operations center, for police, paramilitary, or military operations
 Taste of Chaos, a winter/spring concert series
 Tournament of Champions (debate), a high school debate tournament
 Train operating company in the UK
 Town of Cambridge Perth, Western Australia

Places
 Monte Toc, Italy, site of a major landslide
 Toc, a village in Săvârșin Commune, Arad County, Romania
 Town Centre stop, a Light Rail stop in Hong Kong, by MTR station code

Science and technology
 TOC protocol, an instant message communications protocol
 Translocon at the outer membrane of chloroplast, in beta barrel
 Total organic carbon in an organic compound
 TOC1 (gene), a gene that regulates circadian rhythm in plants
 Theory of computation in computer science
 Transmission oil cooler, a secondary function (or specialized type) of radiator (engine cooling)

Mathematics
 Total operating characteristic, a statistical method to compare a boolean variable and a rank variable

Other
 "T", in the World War I Western Front "signalese" and the RAF phonetic alphabet
 Teacher on call,  a substitute teacher
 Theory of constraints,  a management paradigm
 Theory of change, a methodology to promote social change
 Top of climb, in aviation
 Train operating company

See also
 TCO (disambiguation)
 ToC (disambiguation)